550 may refer to:

550, a year in the Common Era
550 (number), a number
Kawasaki JS550, a  jet ski, produced by Kawasaki Motors
550, the FTP error code meaning "Requested action not taken. File unavailable (e.g., file not found, no access)."
Ferrari 550 Maranello, an automobile produced by Ferrari
Porsche 550, an automobile produced by Porsche
BMW M550d, an automobile produced by BMW
550 Music, a record label
SIG SG 550, an assault rifle
550 cord, a type of parachute cord
Gulfstream G550, marketing name of an aircraft produced by Gulfstream Aerospace
Gulfstream Peregrine, company model number 550, a prototype single-engine business jet
550 Broad Street, an office building in Newark, New Jersey in the United States
Radeon RX 550, a GPU designed by AMD
Tin Yat stop, MTR station code